Schashagen is a municipality in the district of Ostholstein, in Schleswig-Holstein, Germany.

Location 
Schashagen is located about 4 km northeast of Neustadt in Holstein on the Baltic Sea. West of the Federal Highway 1 runs from Lübeck in the direction of Fehmarn, east of the federal highway 501 Neustadt in the direction of Fehmarn.

History 
The Gutsbezirk Brodau was built in 1526 by Heinrich Rantzau on Helmstorf. Schashagen became official district in 1970.

References

Ostholstein